Prodani may refer to:

 Prodani, Romania, a village near Vedea, Argeș
 Prodani, Croatia, a village near Buzet